Labour or Labor Party leadership election may refer to:

Australia
 
1996 Australian Labor Party leadership election
2001 Australian Labor Party leadership election
2003 Australian Labor Party leadership spills
2005 Australian Labor Party leadership spill
2006 Australian Labor Party leadership spill
2010 Australian Labor Party leadership spill
2012 Australian Labor Party leadership spill
 
2019 Australian Labor Party leadership election

Ireland
2014 Labour Party leadership election (Ireland)
2016 Labour Party leadership election (Ireland)
2020 Labour Party leadership election (Ireland)

Israel
 2007 Israeli Labor Party leadership election
 2011 Israeli Labor Party leadership election
 2013 Israeli Labor Party leadership election
 2017 Israeli Labor Party leadership election
 2019 Israeli Labor Party leadership election

Netherlands
 2002 Labour Party (Netherlands) leadership election
 2012 Labour Party (Netherlands) leadership election
 2016 Labour Party (Netherlands) leadership election

New Zealand
 1919 New Zealand Labour Party leadership election
 1920 New Zealand Labour Party leadership election
 1921 New Zealand Labour Party leadership election
 1922 New Zealand Labour Party leadership election
 1923 New Zealand Labour Party leadership election
 1933 New Zealand Labour Party leadership election
 1940 New Zealand Labour Party leadership election
 1951 New Zealand Labour Party leadership election
 1954 New Zealand Labour Party leadership election
 1963 New Zealand Labour Party leadership election
 1965 New Zealand Labour Party leadership election
 1974 New Zealand Labour Party leadership election
 1980 New Zealand Labour Party leadership election
 1983 New Zealand Labour Party leadership election
 1988 New Zealand Labour Party leadership election
 1989 New Zealand Labour Party leadership election
 1990 New Zealand Labour Party leadership election
 1993 New Zealand Labour Party leadership election
 1996 New Zealand Labour Party leadership election
 2008 New Zealand Labour Party leadership election
 2011 New Zealand Labour Party leadership election
 2013 New Zealand Labour Party leadership election
 2014 New Zealand Labour Party leadership election
 2017 New Zealand Labour Party leadership election
 2023 New Zealand Labour Party leadership election

United Kingdom

Leadership
 1922 Labour Party leadership election (UK)
 1931 Labour Party leadership election
 1932 Labour Party leadership election
 1935 Labour Party leadership election
 1955 Labour Party leadership election
 1960 Labour Party leadership election
 1961 Labour Party leadership election
 1963 Labour Party leadership election (UK)
 1976 Labour Party leadership election
 1980 Labour Party leadership election (UK)
 1983 Labour Party leadership election (UK)
 1988 Labour Party leadership election (UK)
 1992 Labour Party leadership election
 1994 Labour Party leadership election
 2007 Labour Party leadership election (UK)
 2010 Labour Party leadership election (UK)
 2015 Labour Party leadership election (UK)
 2016 Labour Party leadership election (UK)
 2020 Labour Party leadership election (UK)

Deputy Leadership
 1952 Labour Party deputy leadership election
 1953 Labour Party deputy leadership election
 1956 Labour Party deputy leadership election
 1959 Labour Party deputy leadership election
 1960 Labour Party deputy leadership election
 1961 Labour Party deputy leadership election
 1962 Labour Party deputy leadership election
 1970 Labour Party deputy leadership election
 1971 Labour Party deputy leadership election
 1972 Labour Party deputy leadership election
 1976 Labour Party deputy leadership election
 1980 Labour Party deputy leadership election
 1981 Labour Party deputy leadership election
 1983 Labour Party deputy leadership election
 1988 Labour Party deputy leadership election
 1992 Labour Party deputy leadership election
 1994 Labour Party deputy leadership election
 2007 Labour Party deputy leadership election
 2015 Labour Party deputy leadership election
 2020 Labour Party deputy leadership election

Scotland

Leadership
 2008 Scottish Labour leadership election
 2011 Scottish Labour leadership election
 2014 Scottish Labour leadership election
 2015 Scottish Labour leadership election
 2017 Scottish Labour leadership election

Deputy Leadership
 2008 Scottish Labour deputy leadership election
 2011 Scottish Labour deputy leadership election
 2014 Scottish Labour deputy leadership election

Wales

Leadership
 1998 Welsh Labour Party leadership election
 1999 Welsh Labour Party leadership election
 2000 Welsh Labour Party leadership election
 2009 Welsh Labour Party leadership election
 2018 Welsh Labour Party leadership election

Deputy Leadership
 2018 Welsh Labour Party deputy leadership election

See also
 
 Labour government (disambiguation)